A Story about a Bad Dream (2000) is a docudrama made by Czech director Pavel Stingl, dramatizing the diary of Eva Erbenova, a young girl who survived the Holocaust. The film based on her memoir uses reenactments. With its child narrator and naive view of World War II, it can appeal to a younger audience.

Summary
The Czech docudrama film was made to preserve Eva Erbenova's personal history for her children and grandchildren. While the film has an artistic appeal for adults, it maintains a tone that's gentle enough for a younger audience. Historic footage of the Nazis, drawings made by Jewish artists from inside the deportation camp, children's drawings of Nazi concentration camps that move and develop on screen, colorful reenacted scenes of her rescue, and Eva's family photographs are compiled to tell the story of a girl who survived the Holocaust. She lost both her parents for reasons she could not fully understand.

A Story about a Bad Dream is an account of the Holocaust told from the perspective of a young girl, who makes sense of the world from her parents' expressions and her own feelings of discomfort and unhappiness.

"Suddenly I was like a grown up," the young narrator confides, describing her arrival at the deportation camp, "I had to take care of myself." Honest and unabashed, the girl Evie offers a unique and highly personal look at the brutality played out during the Second World War.

Evie, like most children, believes her parents control the universe, so she's terrified and shocked when she sees them powerless to Nazi orders. When the family is told of their forced relocation to Theresienstadt, Evie catches the nuances in her parents' expressions and behavior. "I've never seen my parents look so serious," she confides, and their change in demeanor frightens her.

Disease, squalor and death are prevalent at the camp. When they were later sent to a concentration camp, her father was separated from her and her mother. Hunger left Evie looking like a skeleton. When all hope seems to be lost, Evie miraculously escaped and was rescued.

The style of the film is consistently childish. Drawing directly from what's written in the diary, the narrator's vocabulary is too immature to be affected by political correctness, cliché, and prejudice. While the narrator's speech might be limited, the tone is unavoidably honest. Later, when she's riding up to the home of the modest German farming family who rescues her, she says, "I felt like a princess approaching her castle."

The loss and sorrow Evie experienced is too great to be forgotten. She survived the war and is rescued by kindness, but her bright future cannot trump the horrors she has experienced.

Awards

See also
Holocaust
World War II
Holocaust victims

References

External links

A Story about a Bad Dream film review

2000s Czech-language films
Czech independent films
2000s avant-garde and experimental films
Films about the aftermath of the Holocaust
Docudrama films
2000 films